The MOFAT Diamond Scandal involves a senior government official of South Korea allegedly engaging in insider trading and stock-price rigging in coordination with CNK International, which is a mining company that won the mining rights of a diamond mine in Cameroon.

The scandal escalated when the Ministry of Foreign Affairs and Trade (MOFAT) issued a press release on December 17, 2010 that CNK International had won the right to develop a Cameroon diamond mine allegedly containing 420 million carets of diamonds. The number was based on CNK International's own research reports published in 2010 and 2011, which was later found to be false. Energy and Resources Ambassador Kim Eun-seok, who led the government press release, leaked information to family members before the press release, and profited off illegal stock trading based on nonpublic information, which is strictly banned by the Financial Services and Capital Markets Act. In later investigations by the Board of Audit and Inspection, then-ambassador Kim was found to have known that the two probes in Cameroon, conducted to confirm the size of the diamond reserve, had found only six percent of the claimed amount in the company's reports. The share price of CNK International quintupled to around 18,500 Korean won after the government press release, which then fell to 10,000 Korean won around December 2011 when CNK International failed to produce evidence of the claimed diamond-reserve size. The stock price crashed to around 2,000 Korean won by January 2012.

This incident sparked criticisms against the Lee Myung-bak government. The scope of the investigation later spread to other senior South Korean public officials and seven key members of CNK International.

Background

CNK International

CNK International, known as Koko Enterprises at the time, was registered as a food distribution company, mainly treating pork. In December 2008, Koko Enterprises changed registration to metalworking, laying the foundation for entering the diamond-mining business. In March 2009, Oh Deok-gyun took over Koko Enterprises as chairman—a Kosdaq-listed company—and acquired another company that cuts, produces, and sells diamonds both retail and wholesale. In April 2011, Koko Enterprises renamed itself CNK International, following the name of the company Chairman Oh Deok-gyun was in charge of when he acquired Koko Enterprises—C&K Mining (Cameroon & Korea Mining Inc). By this time, the Ministry of Foreign Affairs and Trade had already issued the press release about CNK International's mining rights in Cameroon and CNK International's shares soared.

Research reports of CNK International
CNK International conducted two test probes in 2009 to evaluate the size of the diamond reserve in Cameroon, which formed the basis for the two research reports in 2010 and 2011. These reports initially maintained a low profile until the government press release redirected media attention to what the claimed size of the Cameroon mine was based on. Later, Kim Won-sa, a CNK International executive board member and geology professor at Chungnam National University, was found to have been involved in the August 2008 geological survey of the Mobilong diamond mine but died two months later in October. Before he died, Professor Kim had cited the thickness of the soil horizons in eastern Cameroon where the Mobilong diamond mine is located and the rainforest surrounding the diamond deposit as major obstacles to accurately assessing the amount of diamonds available. C&K Mining, which conducted the exploration, focused on reaching the conglomerate, which would have required digging  into the ground.

Lee Myung-bak's resource diplomacy
The diamond scandal took place amid the Lee Myung-bak government's aggressive push for "resource diplomacy," which describes one of Lee's foreign-policy initiatives, emphasizing collaboration with the international community to achieve resource autonomy. Two months after his inauguration in April 2008, Lee started his trip to 4 major powers—the United States, Japan, China, and Russia—with a state visit to the United States. In the United States, Lee met with President George W. Bush and floated the idea of commercializing gas hydrates that were found off the coast of South Korea, and asked if the U.S. could help. The centerpiece of Lee's visit to Russia was also resource diplomacy, where Lee met with President Dmitry Medvedev and Prime Minister Vladimir Putin in September 2008 and struck a deal in which South Korea would participate in a natural gas pipeline that would deliver Siberian gas through North Korea to Seoul.

Prime Minister Han Seung-soo also visited 3 Central Asian nations (Uzbekistan, Kazakhstan, and Turkmenistan) and Azerbaijan in May 2008 to advance resource diplomacy. Before his departure, Han told the press that he "will support businessmen who will promote energy diplomacy with the [Central Asian] countries and try to guarantee stable and consistent energy diplomacy." Han discussed joint development of energy and natural resources with the Central Asian nations, and struck a long-term contract deal with Uzbekistan to purchase and secure  of Uzbek uranium through 2016.

Meanwhile, a South Korean consortium signed a deal in February 2008 and another in September 2008 with the semiautonomous Kurdish government to develop oil fields in northern Iraq. However, prospects of the oil-development project remained unclear as Baghdad was expected to intervene. In January 2009, Baghdad halted oil exports to South Korea in retaliation. Korea National Oil Corporation that led the consortium pulled out of the Kurdistan exploration block in 2016 and has shut down oil-field projects in the region since.

Energy and Resources Ambassador Kim Eun-seok

Energy and Resources Ambassador Kim Eun-seok directed and ordered the press release, which took place on December 17, 2010. In the issued press release, the Ministry not only confirmed the exaggerated estimate of the diamond deposit but also touted it as a success of the Lee Myung-bak government's "resource diplomacy", which caused the shares of CNK International to quintuple shortly after. The surge in CNK International's stock price triggered an investigation by South Korea's financial regulators, which wound up in the criminal referrals of key figures to the prosecutors' office. Ambassador Kim Eun-seok was investigated for insider trading, as he had shared nonpublic information with family members and saw financial gains, and stock manipulation. The insider-trading charge was dropped as the family members at issue had purchased the stocks long before the press release, and prosecutors deemed it impossible to infer a meaningful connection between the press release and the stock sales. Ambassador Kim Eun-seok was indicted on charges of colluding with CNK International and manipulating stock prices, but acquitted by the Supreme Court.

During the trials, the prosecution presented evidence that Ambassador Kim Eun-seok had aggressively pushed junior diplomats to support CNK International Chairman Oh Deok-gyun. According to multiple emails disclosed throughout the trials, Ambassador Kim had asked Lee Ho-seong, then-Ambassador of Korea to Cameroon, to look into the initial exploration by the United Nations Development Program, which investigated the natural resources in Cameroon but failed to produce results of substance. After Ambassador Lee's lukewarm reaction, Kim Eun-seok turned to more aggressive tactics such as threatening a lower-level government official at an office under the Ministry of Foreign Affairs that covers Africa, who had told Lee to inquire CNK International itself, that he would report the official to the Blue House for "obstructing major diplomatic efforts". Furthermore, Kim Eun-seok was suspected of introducing CNK Chairman Oh Deok-gyun to high-ranking government officials, such as former Vice Minister of Knowledge Economy Park Young-joon. Kim Eun-seok also reportedly lobbied Cameroonian officials on behalf of CNK International, which further fueled the suspicion of collusion.

Ambassador Kim Eun-seok was suspended almost immediately after the scandal broke out with massive media coverage, and later demoted. Then-Minister of Foreign Affairs Kim Sung-hwan had reportedly approved the suspension, which came before the Board of Audit and Inspection could come to a conclusion about whether Ambassador Kim had been actively colluding with CNK International and deliberately overstated the size of the Mobilong diamond mine in the press release. Kim Eun-seok filed a lawsuit challenging both the suspension and demotion. Despite the acquittal on charges of stock manipulation, the Supreme Court held that his demotion was fair on the grounds that he had neglected his duty as a public servant to verify unfounded claims about the Cameroonian mine in CNK International's reports, and therefore violated the principle of trust and good faith. At the same time, the high court reinstated Kim, ending his suspension of almost 6 years.

Development
On December 17, 2010, Energy and Resources Ambassador Kim Eun-seok led the press release in the name of the Ministry of Foreign Affairs and Trade (now Ministry of Foreign Affairs), touting CNK International's winning the right to mine diamonds in Cameroon as a success story of the Lee Myung-bak government's resource diplomacy. The press release served as an official confirmation from Lee Myung-bak's government that a Korean mining company had procured the world's biggest diamond mine. The sudden surge in CNK's stock price got the attention of the National Assembly, which then asked the Board of Audit and Inspection to look into whether government officials, including Ambassador Kim Eun-seok, had engaged in stock manipulation and insider trading. In October 2011, the Board of Audit and Inspection and the Financial Supervisory Service, South Korea's financial regulator, launched a joint investigation.

On January 17, 2012, before the inspectors even made the announcement about what they found out in the investigation, the Ministry of Foreign Affairs and Trade suspended Ambassador Kim from duty until the inspection would be over. Meanwhile, on January 19, 2012, the Knowledge Economy Committee of the National Assembly voted in favor of referring CNK Chairman Oh Deok-gyun and Ambassador Kim Eun-seok to Seoul Southern District Prosecutors' Office for criminal investigation, criticizing the "sluggish" response of the inspection board. This further spurred a selloff of CNK International's shares and its stock price plummeted and closed at  January 19, 2012. On January 26, 2012, the inspection board announced the findings of its investigation, which stated that Kim Eun-seok shared information about CNK International's diamond project with his two siblings on the Lunar New Year of 2009 and the two siblings proceeded to purchase 41,334 shares of CNK International between March 18, 2009 and April 3, 2009, and in total 80,000 shares by January 2010. Furthermore, as of August 31, 2011, Kim's siblings had realized  in capital gains while holding onto the remaining 78,000 shares. The inspection board demanded that the Ministry of Foreign Affairs and Trade dismiss Ambassador Kim. CNK International's stock price fell another  and closed at  December 26, 2012.

On January 19, 2012, the opposition Democratic United Party and the anti-Lee Myung-bak faction of the ruling Grand National Party under Park Geun-hye threatened to launch another National Assembly investigation to further examine whether higher-ups were involved, such as President Lee Myung-bak's older brother, who had been involved in President Lee's resource-diplomacy efforts. However, it eventually fizzled out and the additional investigation did not come to fruition.

Following the inspection board's request for Kim's dismissal, Kim was referred to the Central Disciplinary Committee under the Ministry of Foreign Affairs and Trade on January 27, 2012, which would determine the level of punishment Kim should receive in response to the purported malfeasance. The committee decided to demote Kim from Grade 1 public servant to Grade 3.

On January 26, 2013, Seoul Central District Prosecutors' Office raided the headquarters of CNK International and the houses of Chairman Oh and Cho Joong-pyo, an adviser for CNK International who had formerly been vice foreign minister.

On January 30, 2012, Seoul Central District Prosecutors' Office raided the Ministry of Foreign Affairs and Trade for the first time in history, after obtaining a search warrant from the court. The prosecutors then asked a judge for an arrest warrant against Kim on March 6, 2012, but the judge rejected it, stating that Kim is not a flight risk (as he had already been banned from traveling abroad) and that the prosecution failed to provide sufficient evidence that Kim might destroy or alter evidence. Prosecutors added perjury to Kim's charges, claiming Kim had lied—under oath during a National Assembly hearing in 2011—that he merely cited official Cameroonian-government data in the press release for the amount of diamonds, when in fact he took it from the embellished CNK reports without independently confirming it.

On February 19, 2013, Kim and four more key figures, including CNK International Chairman Oh Deok-gyun, a CNK International lawyer, and two accountants, were indicted on charges of violating the Financial Investment Services and Capital Markets Act and deliberately overestimating the market value of CNK International. When the ambassador of South Korea to Cameroon reported to Kim Eun-seok about the mining deal that CNK International had won, Kim further relayed the information to Vice Minister of Knowledge Economy Park Young-joon, who fell outside of Kim's direct chain of command. This had ensnared Park in the criminal investigation but the prosecutors eventually dropped all charges against Park.

At the time of the indictment, Chairman Oh was on the run, allegedly in Cameroon. He returned to South Korea on March 23, 2014, after 2 years as a fugitive. Upon arrival, Oh was immediately arrested.

Aftermath
On January 23, 2015, the trial court judge ruled in favor of Kim Eun-seok, clearing him of all charges. The court also found Chairman Oh not guilty on stock-manipulation charges but sentenced him to 1 year and 6 months in prison and 2 years probation for breach of fiduciary duty. 

The prosecution appealed to the Seoul High Court, one of South Korea's appellate courts. On February 3, 2016, the Seoul High Court again found Kim not guilty, stating that "although the court is not fully convinced that there was no collusion between Kim and CNK International, various parts of the press release are factual, including the involvement of the Cameroonian government in the geological survey," implying that the evidence did not rise beyond a reasonable doubt to convict Kim. However, the appellate court reversed the lower court's ruling on Chairman Oh and found him guilty of stock-price rigging, saying "Oh had embellished the company's reports with baseless estimates as if they were scientific and factual, thereby unscrupulously influencing the capital market." Chairman Oh was sentenced to 3 years in prison and 5 years probation.

The prosecution appealed again to the Supreme Court of South Korea, Korea's court of final appeal. On June 8, 2017, the Supreme Court of Korea acquitted Kim of all charges and upheld the lower court's verdict on Chairman Oh.

While the criminal case was proceeding, Kim filed an administrative lawsuit against the foreign affairs minister, asking the court to reverse the disciplinary actions against him. The court of first instance held that Kim cannot be blamed for passionately promoting his perceived accomplishments, albeit slightly exaggerated, and reversed Kim's demotion. The appellate court upheld the lower court's ruling, stating that senior diplomats should be able to exercise discretion in determining which enterprises to support. However, on January 8, 2018, the Supreme Court overturned the decision of the appellate court, finding that Kim neglected his duty as a civil servant to verify CNK's claims and noting that Kim’s endorsement of CNK's business led to significant financial gains of CNK International at the expense of ordinary investors and the health of the financial market. The Supreme Court also added that, despite opposition from within his own ministry, Kim created and published a second press release that read as if the Cameroonian government had officially provided the exaggerated estimates. Furthermore, the Supreme Court decision said that Kim's actions damaged the public trust in the Foreign Affairs Ministry and injured diplomatic reputation, and finalized Kim's demotion. The Supreme Court however overturned Kim's dismissal and reinstated him.

CNK International filed a lawsuit against the Korea Exchange challenging the Korea Exchange's decision to delist CNK International from Kosdaq. In January 2020, the Supreme Court upheld the lower court's ruling and reaffirmed the delisting of CNK International. As of January 2023, the web link of CNK International's homepage is connected to an illegal gambling site.

See also
Corruption in South Korea
Prime Minister's Office Civilian Surveillance Incident
2008 Grand National Party Convention Bribery Incident

References

External links
 Diamond Scandal Spreads in Seoul

2012 in South Korea
Corruption in South Korea
Political scandals in South Korea
Lee Myung-bak Government
2012 scandals